In 2019, Arundel Rivers was formed by joining South River Federation with the West Rhode Riverkeeper, Inc. Located in Edgewater, Maryland, USA, the Arundel Rivers Federation, Inc. is a grassroots organization of more than 500 members whose goal is to "preserve, protect and celebrate" the South River and its ecosystem through:

 monitoring and assessment
 education and enforcement
 large scale restoration
 outreach and promotion of responsible stewardship

Full-time staff includes the South,  West, and Rhode RiverKeeper, who monitor and document the health of the rivers via weekly bacteria testing and water quality sampling from May through September.

External links
Official website

Non-profit organizations based in Maryland